Wemyss Gorman or Wemyss-Gorman is a surname. Notable people with the surname include:
Antonette Wemyss Gorman (born 1972 or 1973), Jamaican Chief of Defence Staff
Nigel Patrick (1912-1981), British actor born Nigel Dennis Patrick Wemyss-Gorman